Paul DeBoy (born September 14, 1955) is an American actor. He is best known for appearances in A Dirty Shame as Wendell Doggett, Red Dead Redemption as Jimmy Saint, Haber as Bernhard Moritz and for episodes of Law & Order and Law & Order: Trial by Jury.

Early life and education 
DeBoy was born in Baltimore, Maryland. He earned an associate of arts degree from the American Academy of Dramatic Arts and attended the Royal Academy of Arts.

Career 
DeBoy played Harry Bright in the North American Tour of Mamma Mia!. He covered two roles in the Second Stage Theater's production of Eurydice by Sarah Ruhl. He has a long history in regional theatre, including Clean House at Cincinnati Playhouse in the Park; Heartbreak House at The Repertory Theatre of St. Louis; The Real Thing at Pioneer Theatre Company; Sight Unseen at Manhattan Theatre Club; Sylvia at Cleveland Play House; ...Young Lady From Rwanda at Kansas City Repertory Theatre; The Swan at American Stage; Cat on A Hot Tin Roof at Shea's 710 Theatre; Blithe Spirit at the Olney Theatre Center; and The Einstein Project at Theatre for The First Amendment.

Personal life 
DeBoy is a cousin of actor PJ DeBoy and politician Steven J. DeBoy Sr.

Filmography

Film

Television

Video games

References

External links

American male film actors
Living people
Male actors from Baltimore
1955 births